"Party Time" is a song written by Bruce Channel, and recorded by American country music artist T. G. Sheppard.  It was released in June 1981 as the second single from the album I Love 'Em All.  The song was Sheppard's eighth number one on the country chart.  The single stayed at number one for one week and spent a total of thirteen weeks on the country chart.

Charts

References
 

1981 singles
1981 songs
T. G. Sheppard songs
Song recordings produced by Buddy Killen
Warner Records singles
Curb Records singles
Songs written by Bruce Channel
Songs about parties